The men's decathlon event at the 1994 Commonwealth Games was held at the Centennial Stadium in Victoria, British Columbia on 23 and 24 August.

Results

References

Results, part 1
Results, part 2
Results, part 3

Decathlon
1994